A troll farm or troll factory is an institutionalised group of internet trolls that seeks to interfere in political opinions and decision-making.

One study showed that 30 governments worldwide (out of 65 covered by the study) paid keyboard armies to spread propaganda and attack critics. According to the report, these governments use paid commentators, trolls, and bots to harass journalists and erode trust in the media. Attempts were made to influence elections in 18 of the countries covered by the study.

Albania
In February 2020, the New York Times interviewed 10 ex-People's Mujahedin of Iran (MEK) members who said that the MEK's Albania camp had a troll farm that promoted the opinions of MEK supporters, including Rudy Giuliani and John Bolton, and attacked the Iranian government. The MEK claimed that the former members were Iranian government spies.

In the March 2021 CIB (Coordinated Inauthentic Behavior) report, Facebook announced that it removed hundreds of accounts, pages and groups in both Facebook and Instagram which were in a troll farm in Albania, operated by MEK.

Brazil
It has been widely suspected that Brazil's president Jair Bolsonaro and his family created troll farms to promote support for his government policies and to attack and harass rivals through the internet. These fake accounts and bots are possibly controlled by an office inside one of Bolsonaro's government buildings led by Jair's son Carlos known as 'office of hate', which is suspected to have created more than a thousand fake accounts to support Bolsonaro's government.

Troll accounts have also been linked to misinformation related to the COVID-19 pandemic in Brazil, as Bolsonaro's government is known for having adopted a denialist and weak posture regarding the pandemic.

India
India's ruling party BJP has a large number of online supporters who support its agenda and attack political rivals. Their methods were recorded by investigative journalist Swati Chaturvedi who described them as "digital army" in her book the subject, "I Am a Troll: Inside the Secret World of the BJP's Digital Army".

China

"50 Cent Party" is a term used for online users who have been hired by the authorities of the People's Republic of China to manipulate public opinion and disseminate disinformation to the benefit of the governing Chinese Communist Party (CCP).

Finland 
Finnish investigative journalist Jessikka Aro interviewed workers at a “troll factory” in Saint Petersburg. Aro was harassed online after she published her story. A court in Helsinki convicted three persons who had harassed Aro on charges of defamation and negligence.

Aro has stated that online trolls can negatively affect freedom of speech and democracy.

North Macedonia
At the town of Veles, locals launched at least 140 United States political websites supporting Donald Trump.

In 2020, during the COVID-19 pandemic, Facebook found that troll farms from North Macedonia and the Philippines pushed coronavirus disinformation. The publisher, which used content from these farms, was banned.

Malaysia
In 2022, Meta Platforms announced that it has removed hundreds of Facebook and Instagram accounts that were directly linked with the Royal Malaysia Police (RMP), as they were used as part of a troll farm to disseminate propaganda and manipulate public discourse about the Malaysian police and the government. Meta added that such actions were against its policy of "coordinated inauthentic behaviour".

Philippines

The Philippines has been called "patient zero in the global disinformation epidemic." Studies into the country's troll farms found that political campaigns pay trolls $1,000 to $2,000 per month to create multiple fake social media accounts to post political propaganda and attack critics. The political campaign of President Rodrigo Duterte has spent $200,000 to hire online trolls, according to one study. Duterte admitted to hiring trolls for his 2016 political campaign.

Since then, trolling behaviour supportive of Duterte has been traced back to taxpayer-funded government institutions.

Russia

The Russian web brigades, including Internet Research Agency, became known in the late 2010s for the Russian interference in the 2016 United States elections. The Internet Research Agency has employed troll armies to spread propaganda, command Twitter trends, and sow fear and erode trust in American political and media institutions.

Turkey 

The ruling Justice and Development Party of Turkey has a troll farm commonly known as AK Trolls.

Nicaragua 
In November 2021, Facebook reported that it closed accounts, groups and pages in Facebook and Instagram linked to a troll farm operated by the Sandinista National Liberation Front, the ruling party in Nicaragua.

United States
During the 2020 United States presidential election and the COVID-19 pandemic, Turning Point USA and its affiliate Turning Point Action were described as troll farms for paying young conservatives in Phoenix, Arizona, some of them minors with parental support, to post misinformation about the integrity of the electoral process and the threat of COVID-19. The payout included bonuses for posts that generated greater engagement. They used their own social media accounts or fake accounts without disclosing their relationship with Turning Point and were instructed by Turning Point to slightly alter and repost the modified messages a limited number of times to avoid automatic detection.

Since the early 2020s, American conservatives have accused the website TikTok of spying on its users in cooperation with the Chinese government. These accusations and conspiracy theories were reportedly created in part by Republican consulting firms such as Targeted Victory as well as Facebook parent Meta.

Vietnam

See also

References

Internet trolling